Genoni is a surname. Notable people with the surname include: 

Leonardo Genoni (born 1987), Swiss ice hockey player
Rosa Genoni (1867–1954), Italian fashion designer, teacher, feminist and advocate for workers' rights